Kris Kirchner (born 1960) is an American former competition swimmer who represented the United States in international events.  At the 1979 Pan American Games in San Juan Puerto, Rico, he won a gold medal as a member of the winning U.S. team in the 4x200-metre freestyle relay, together with teammates Brian Goodell, David Larson and Rowdy Gaines.  He qualified to be a member of the U.S. team for the 1980 Summer Olympics in Moscow, but was unable to participate as a result of the United States-led boycott of the games because of the Soviet Union's invasion of Afghanistan.

He initially attended Cleveland State University, and competed for the Cleveland State Vikings in National Collegiate Athletic Association (NCAA) competition in 1977 and 1978.  After the Pan American Games, he subsequently transferred to the University of Texas at Austin, where he swam for coach Eddie Reese's Texas Longhorns swimming and diving team in 1980 and 1981.  He won the NCAA national championship in the 50-yard freestyle, and another in the 400-yard medley relay with teammates Clay Britt, Scott Spann and William Paulus, helping the Longhorns win their first-ever NCAA national team championship in 1981.

Kirchner was the head coach of the Indiana Hoosiers swimming and diving team, at Indiana University, from 1991 to 2002.  He previously served as an assistant coach for the Texas Longhorns, and head coach for the South Carolina Gamecocks swimming and diving team at the University of South Carolina from 1986 to 1991.

See also 

 List of University of Texas at Austin alumni

References 

1960 births
Living people
American male freestyle swimmers
Cleveland State Vikings men's swimmers
Indiana Hoosiers swimming coaches
South Carolina Gamecocks swimming coaches
Swimmers at the 1979 Pan American Games
Texas Longhorns swimming coaches
Texas Longhorns men's swimmers
Pan American Games gold medalists for the United States
Pan American Games medalists in swimming
Universiade medalists in swimming
Universiade gold medalists for the United States
Medalists at the 1981 Summer Universiade
Medalists at the 1979 Pan American Games